Olimpia Zambrów is a Polish football club located in Zambrów, Poland. It plays in the III liga, group I. The team's primary colors are blue, white, and black.

External links
 

 
1953 establishments in Poland
Association football clubs established in 1953